Cockett is the name of an electoral ward in the City and County of Swansea, Wales, UK. The ward is coterminous with the Cockett community. It elects three councillors.

The electoral ward consists of some or all of the following areas: Cadle, Cwmdu, Coedweig, Gendros, Gors, Fforestfach and Cockett, in the parliamentary constituency of Swansea West.  The ward is bounded by the wards of Kingsbridge and Penderry to the north; Cwmbwrla to the east; Townhill to the south east; Sketty and Killay North to the south; and Gowerton to the west.

Following a local government boundary review, effective from the 2022 local elections, Waunarlwydd was removed from the Cockett ward to become its own ward (and community). As a result, the number of councillors elected in Cockett reduced from four to three.

Local Council Elections

2022
Turnout for the 2022 local election was 27.7%.

2017
Turnout for the 2017 local election was 32.73%.

2015 by-election
The 2015 by-election results were announced alongside the 2015 UK General Election results, in the Swansea Maritime Quarter. The turnout was 6253 out of 10528 registered electors, i.e. 59.4%: almost double the 2012 turnout.

The results were:

2012
The turnout for Cockett in the 2012 local council elections was 32.89%. The results were:

1999
In 1999, Dr Dai Lloyd, who had captured a seat from Labour at a by-election topped the poll and Plaid Cymru also captured a second seat.

1995
The first election to the new unitary City and County of Swansea Council took place in 1995. All four seats were won by Labour although the Plaid Cymru candidate, local GP Dai Lloyd also polled strongly.

Districts of Cockett
The suburb of Cockett is a residential area in the ward.

The suburb of Fforestfach lies immediately north of the suburb of Cockett.

References

Swansea electoral wards